"A Useless Death" is a poem by Patti Smith, published as a chapbook in 1972.

Plot
The poem talks about a person witnessing the execution of a queen.

References

External links 
 Poem
 

Poetry by Patti Smith
1972 poems